Dolichoderus taprobanae is a species of ant in the genus Dolichoderus. Described by Smith in 1858, the species is endemic to Asia.

References

Dolichoderus
Hymenoptera of Asia
Insects described in 1858